This is a chronological list of the last known surviving veterans of battles, sieges, campaigns, and other military operations throughout history. The listed operations span from the 5th century BC to the end of World War II. Excluded from this list are last living veterans of wars and insurgencies.

Pre-17th century

17th century

18th century

19th century

20th century

See also

 List of last surviving veterans of military insurgencies and wars
 Last European veterans by war
 Last surviving United States war veterans
 List of last survivors of historical events
 List of last surviving Canadian war veterans
 List of last surviving World War I veterans by country

References

Lists of military veterans
Veterans
Military operations